The HG 85 (Hand Granate M1985) is a round fragmentation hand grenade designed for the Swiss Armed Forces and still produced by RUAG Ammotec in Switzerland. HG 85 is the internal designation of the Swiss Army and replaces the HG 43 from WWII.

On detonation the steel body, containing 155 g TNT, releases around 1800 fragments weighing on average 0.1 grams. UK grenade range safety data suggests the L109 – and by extension all live versions – may represent a danger at ranges up to 200 m.

Function 
The grenade is spherical with a bushing on the top threaded internally to accept the DM 82 CH fuze mechanism. Due to its specially constructed fuze and packaging, the grenade is considered very secure. It is designed to be effective against opponents wearing body armour, up to 20 layers of Kevlar and 1.6mm of titanium.

A supplementary spring steel safety clip is clipped over the safety lever and bushing on top of the grenade preventing the safety lever from moving.

Variants

EUHG 85 
In the Swiss Army there is a training hand grenade with nearly the same size TNT charge (120 vs. 155 g), but no shrapnel mantle. It is designated EUHG 85 for Explosiv-Übungshandgranate (explosive training hand granade). They are the same size, shape and weight, made up by adding iron powder, as the HG 85, and painted a coarse black. They are stamped "EXPLOSIV". They function in the same way as the HG 85. Due to the substantial explosive charge they are dangerous. The grenade housing, especially the fuze block, causes some fragmentation.

Mark HG 85 
Initial training in the Swiss Army is done with a Markier Handgranate 85. It is equal in size and shape to the HG 85, but contains no explosive charge. A small bang charge can be inserted by unscrewing the upper part (where the fuze and lever are). Releasing the lever ("spoon") activates a striker that fires the charge to produce a bang. This is used for training purposes especially when there is OpFor to simulate an explosion but not endanger anyone. The Mark HG 85 can be recovered and reloaded with another banger.

Manip HG 85 
The Manip HG (for manipulation) is used for learning the basic movements and practising throwing hand granades in the Swiss Army. It is the same size and shape as a real HG 85, but with no moving parts. It is produced as a solid polymer block and painted bright orange, for easy recovery in the field. The first picture link below shows both Manip and EUHG 85.

L109A1 
In September 2000 a six-year contract with Swiss Ammunition Enterprise Corporation (a RUAG subsidiary) was announced, committing the UK to purchase around 363,000 grenades for combat and live training, first deliveries scheduled for March 2001.

The L109 is the British designation for the HG 85. It differs from the HG 85 in that it has a special safety clip (matte black in colour, which is similar to the safety clip on the American M67 grenade.

The L109 is deep bronze green in colour with golden yellow stencilling, and a rough exterior comparable to light sandpaper, and a yellow band around the top bushing, and weighs 465gm.  Markings give the designation "GREN HAND HE L109A1", a manufacturer marking "SM" meaning "Swiss Munitions", and a lot number. (Markings on the safety lever give the designation and lot number of the fuze.)

Once the safety pin is pulled, the grenade is live but so long as the fly-off lever ("spoon") is kept depressed while the grenade is held (and the grenade can be held indefinitely with the pin out) it can be safely returned to storage so long as the fly-off safety lever is still in the closed position and the safety pin reinserted. However, if thrown – or the lever allowed to rise – the protective plastic cover falls away and the striker, under pressure of the striker spring, begins to rotate on its axis. This causes the safety lever to be thrown clear, the striker continues to rotate until it hits the percussion cap, which fires and ignites the delay pellet. The heat of the burning delay pellet melts solder holding a retaining ring, allowing the detonator to move under the influence of a spring from the safe to armed position. The delay pellet continues to burn and after between 3 and 4 seconds burns out and produces a flash that forces aside a flap valve allowing ignition. When the flash reaches the detonator this initiates a booster charge which in turn initiates the main explosive filling.

L110A1 
The L110 (Drill Grenade) is an entirely inert (no explosive content) version of the L109.

Identical in size, weight and shape, as the live grenade and is used for training purposes, specifically correct handling and throwing. It can be easily distinguished from the live grenade as it is dark blue with white markings  (see below).

The body is solid aluminium with a textured plastic coating made in the same form as the live grenade, the textured coating ensuring a good gripping surface. A hole drilled up from the bottom indicates an empty store as well as ensuring the drill grenade is of the same weight as a live grenade. A bushing on top of the grenade has a dummy fuze mechanism permanently attached with a slot for the pull ring to clip into to prevent it being accidentally pulled. The fuze mechanism, under the plastic cover is very similar in appearance to the American fuze mechanisms. Internally there is an extension on the striker to allow it to be re-cocked during training and there is a leaf spring safety that clips around the safety lever and neck of the grenade preventing the lever from rotating even if the safety pin is pulled.

The markings are 'GREN HAND INERT DRILL L110A1' and a manufacturers marking "SM" meaning Swiss Munitions. The fuze mechanism is marked on the wide bottom portion of the lever "HG2 DM 82 CH".

L111A1 
This practice grenade has a small simulation charge (flash/bang) that imitates a live grenade for training purposes. It is distinguishable from the wholly inert L110 by being a much lighter blue and is fitted with a distinctive gold/orange plastic cap and safety lever.

The body of the L111A1 is made of steel, is covered in a textured plastic material and has the word 'PRACTICE' embossed near the top of the body, near a top portion which is larger than the bushing on the live grenade. Like the L110 there is a large aperture in the bottom of the grenade which demonstrates it is not a live grenade, but in the L111A this aperture allow gas from the practice fuse to escape. Consisting of two parts, a grey reusable striker mechanism and an L162 practice fuse (which has a blue body with a brown base and is fitted with a silver washer) the practice fuse is fitted into the bottom of the reusable striker mechanism then the entire assembly is screwed into the top of the grenade. In this version the safety lever is attached by a plastic strap to prevent loss, the entire unit, apart from the expended L162 practice fuse, being reused.

Markings, again in white, include 'GREN HAND PRAC L111A1', a manufacturers mark 'SM' meaning Swiss Munitions, and a lot number.

Nr300 
The Nr300 is the Dutch designation for the HG 85. It is exactly like the L109. There is also the Nr330.

OHG92  	
Offensive grenade, painted black with a yellow band around the neck. OHG92's were produced for export only.

Users 

The HG 85 entered service in the Swiss Army in 1985. It is also used in a number of other European armies and armies in the Middle and Far East.

 
 Handgranate 85 (HG 85) / Grenade à main 85 (gren main 85) / granata a mano 85 (gran mano 85) : fragmentation
 Explosiv-Übungshandgranate 85 (EUGH 85) / grenade à main d’exercice explosive 85 (gren main ex exp 85) : training, manipulation, full blast
 Explosiv-Übungshandgranate 11 (EUHG 11) / grenade à main d’exercice explosive 11 (gren main ex exp 11)
 Markier-Handgranate 85 (Mark HG 85) / grenade à main de marquage 85 (gren main 85 marq) with explosive cartridge (Knallpatrone [KPat (Mark HG 85)] / cartouche détonante [cart déto (gren main 85 marq)] : training, manipulation, small charge
 Wurfkörper-Handgranate 85 (WurfK HG 85) / corps de lancement grenade à main 85 (lanc gren main 85) : training, throwing practice, inert

 
 GREN HAND HE L109A1 (hand grenade)
 GREN HAND INERT DRILL L110A1 (inert drill hand grenade)
 GREN HAND PRAC L111A1 (practice hand grenade)

 
 OFFHGR-85
 SPLHGR-85

 
 Nr300
 Nr330

References

External links 
Pictures of the HG 85
Pictures of the L109
Pictures of the L110

Fragmentation grenades
Weapons of Switzerland
Hand grenades of the United Kingdom